Ceratolacis is a genus of flowering plants belonging to the family Podostemaceae.

Its native range is Brazil.

Species:

Ceratolacis erythrolichen 
Ceratolacis pedunculatum

References

Podostemaceae
Malpighiales genera